Andi or ANDI may refer to:

People and fictional characters
 Andy (given name), including people and fictional characters with the name Andi
 Andi people, an ethnic group of Dagestan, Russia

Places
 Andi, Guizhou, a town in Jinsha County, Guizhou, China
 Andi, Shandong, a town in Yinan County, Shandong, China
 Andi, Zhejiang, a town in Jinhua, Zhejiang, China
 Andi, Estonia, a village in Lääne-Viru County
 Andi, Republic of Dagestan, Russia, a rural locality

Other uses 
Andi language, the Northeast Caucasian language they speak
ANDi, a rhesus monkey
Aggregate Nutrient Density Index
American Nitrox Divers International (Now ANDI, International)

See also
Andy (disambiguation)
And I (disambiguation)
AND1, an American shoe and clothing company